Jan Hendrik Bruinier (born 21 October 1971) is a German mathematician, whose work focuses on number theory.

Work
In 2011, together with Ken Ono, he developed a finite algebraic formula for the values of the partition function.

Recognition
He was named to the 2023 class of Fellows of the American Mathematical Society, "for contributions to number theory, automorphic forms, and arithmetic geometry".

External links
 Bruinier's homepage at the TU Darmstadt

References

21st-century German mathematicians
Number theorists
1971 births
Living people
Fellows of the American Mathematical Society